Princess Alexandra Hospital may refer to the following hospitals:

 Princess Alexandra Hospital, Anguilla
 Princess Alexandra Hospital, Brisbane, Queensland, Australia
 Princess Alexandra Hospital, Harlow, Essex, England